is a JR West Hakubi Line station. The station is named after the Gōkei area, a scenic valley about 8 km north of the station. Gōkei Station is located in Shisawa, Sōja, Okayama Prefecture, Japan.

History
1925-02-17: Shisawa Station opens as part of the Hakubi South Line
1935-05-16: Shisawa Station is renamed to Gōkei Station
1987-04-01: Japanese National Railways is privatized, and Gōkei Station became a JR West station

Station layout
Gōkei Station has two platforms capable of handling three lines simultaneously. The platforms are connected via a foot bridge overpass.

Around the station
The area near Gōkei Station is fairly flat and open as most of the housing in the area is not located directly around the station. The Gōkei Police Station and Gōkei Post office are located near the station. The Takahashi River is located across Japan National Route 180, about 200m southeast of Gōkei Station.

Highway access
 Japan National Route 180
 Okayama Prefectural Route 57 (Sōja-Kayō Route)
 Okayama Prefectural Route 278 (Shisawa-Mabi Route)

Connecting lines
JR West Hakubi Line
Sōja Station — Gōkei Station — Hiwa Station

See also
List of railway stations in Japan

External links
 JR West

Hakubi Line
Railway stations in Okayama Prefecture
Railway stations in Japan opened in 1925